Zaommomentedon is a genus of hymenopteran insects of the family Eulophidae.

References
 Key to Nearctic eulophid genera
 Universal Chalcidoidea Database

Eulophidae
Taxa named by Alexandre Arsène Girault